Heliophanus kenyaensis is a jumping spider species in the genus Heliophanus.  It was first described by Wanda Wesołowska in 1986 and lives in Central Africa.

References

Spiders described in 1986
Salticidae
Spiders of Africa
Taxa named by Wanda Wesołowska